Bangladesh Krishak Sramik Awami League (BaKSAL) (বাকশাল) was a political front comprising Bangladesh Awami League, Communist Party of Bangladesh, National Awami Party (Muzaffar) and Jatiyo League.

Following the Fourth Amendment to the Constitution of Bangladesh, enacted on 25 January 1975, Sheikh Mujibur Rahman formed BaKSAL on 24 February. In addition, with the presidential order, all other political parties were outlawed with the formation of BaKSAL.

The party advocated state socialism as a part of the group of reforms under the theory of the Second Revolution. BaKSAL was the decision-making council to achieve the objectives of the Second Revolution.

BaKSAL was dissolved after the assassination of Sheikh Mujibur Rahman in August 1975. With the end of BaKSAL, all the political parties who had merged with BaKSAL, including the Awami League, again became independent political parties.

Background 

Sheikh Mujibur Rahman (aka Mujibur) and his Awami League won a landslide victory in the 1973 Bangladeshi general election. Backing for the government waned, however, as supporters became disillusioned by widespread corruption. In the face of growing unrest, on 28 December 1974 Mujibur declared a state of emergency, which gave him the power to ban any political group. He pushed the Fourth Amendment to the constitution through parliament on 25 January 1975. It dissolved all political parties and gave him the authority to institute one-party rule.

Formation 

On 24 February 1975, Mujibur formed a new party, the Bangladesh Krishak Sramik Awami League (BaKSAL), which all MPs were required to join. Any MP who missed a parliamentary session, abstained, or failed to vote with the party would lose their seat. All civilian government employees, professionals, and trade union leaders were pressed to join the party. All other political organisations were banned. Most Awami League politicians and many from other parties joined BaKSAL, seeing no other way to retain any political power. The Jatiyo Samajtantrik Dal, Purba Banglar Sarbahara Party, Purbo Bangla Sammobadi Dal-Marxbadi-Leninbadi (East Bengal Communist Party Marxist–Leninist), East Pakistan Communist Party, and Bangladesh Communist Party (Leninist) did not join BaKSAL. According to political science professor Talukder Maniruzzaman, BaKSAL was in practice "the Awami League under a different name".

BaKSAL was scheduled to officially replace the nation's other political organisations, whether those political parties agreed or not, and associations, on 1 September 1975.

Organizationally, President Mujibur Rahman, BaKSAL chairman, appointed for the national party a fifteen-member executive committee, a 120-member central committee, and five front organisations, namely, Jatiya Krishak League, Jatiya Sramik League, Jatiya Mahila League, Jatiya Juba League and Jatiya Chhatra League (peasants, workers, women, youth, and students respectively). All members of the executive committee and central committee were to enjoy the status of ministers. BaKSAL was also designed to overhaul the administrative system of the country to make it people-oriented.

Executive committee 

 Sheikh Mujibur Rahman (Chairman)
 Syed Nazrul Islam (Vice-Chairman)
 Muhammad Mansur Ali (Secretary General)
 Abul Hasnat Muhammad Qamaruzzaman
 Abdul Mannan
 Khondaker Mostaq Ahmad
 Abdul Malek Ukil
 Professor M. Yousuf Ali
 Manaranjan Dhar
 Muzaffar Ahmed Chowdhury
 Sheikh Abdul Aziz
 Mohiuddin Ahmed
 Gazi Golam Mostafa
 Zillur Rahman
 Sheikh Fazlul Haque Mani
 Abdur Razzaq

Central Committee 

 Sheikh Mujibur Rahman
 Syed Nazrul Islam
 Muhammad Mansur Ali
 Abdul Mannan
 Abdul Malik Ukil
 Khondaker Mostaq Ahmad
 A.H.M Kamaruzzaman
 Kazi Linchon
 Mahmudullah
 Abdus Samad Azad
 M. Yousuf Ali
 Phani Bhushan Majumder
 Kamal Hossain
 Muhammad Sohrab Hossain
 Abdur Rab Serniabat
 Manaranjan Dhar
 Abdul Matin
 Asaduzzanan
 Md Korban Ali
 Dr. Azizul Rahman Mallik
 Dr. Muzaffar Ahmed Chowdhury
 Tofael Ahmed
 Shah Moazzam Hossain
 Abdul Momin Talukdar
 Dewan Farid Gazi
 Professor Nurul Islam Choudhry
 Taheruddin Thakur
 Moslemuddin Khan
 Professor Abu Sayeed
 Nurul Islam Manzur
 KM Obaidur Rahman
 Dr. Khitish Chandra Mandal
 Reazuddin Ahmad
 M. Baitullah
 Rahul Quddus (Secretary)
 Zillur Rahman
 Mohiuddin Ahmad MP
 Sheikh Fazlul Haque Mani
 Abdur Razzaq
 Sheikh Shahidul Islam
 Anwar Choudhry
 Syeda Sajeda Chowdhury
 Taslima Abed
 Abdur Rahim
 Abdul Awal
 Lutfur Rahman
 A.K. Muzibur Rahman
 Dr. Mofiz Choudhry
 Dr. Alauddin Ahammad
 Dr. Ahsanul Haq
 Raushan Ali
 Azizur Rahman Akkas
 Sheikh Abdul Aziz
 Salahuddin Yusuf
 Michael Sushil Adhikari
 Kazi Abdul Hakim
 Mollah Jalaluddin
 Shamsuddin Mollah
 Gour Chandra Bala
 Gazi Ghulam Mustafa
 Shamsul Haq
 Shamsuzzoha
 Rafiqueuddin Bhuiya
 Syed Ahmad
 Shamsur Rahman Khan Shahjahan
 Nurul Haq
 Kazi Zahirul Qayyum
 Capt.(Retd) Sujjat Ali
 M.R. Siddiqui
 MA Wahab
 Chittaranjan Sutar,
 Sayeda Razia Banu
 Ataur Rahman Khan
 Khandakar Muhammad Illyas
 Mong Pru Saire
 Professor Muzaffar Ahmed Chowdhury
 Ataur Rahman
 Pir Habibur Rahman
 Syed Altaf Hossain
 Muhammad Farhad
 Matia Chowdhury
 Hazi Danesh
 Taufiq Inam (Secretary)
 Nurul Islam (Secretary)
 Fayezuddin Ahmed (Secretary)
 Mahbubur Rahman (Secretary)
 Abdul Khaleque
 Muzibul Haq (Secretary)
 Abdur Rahim (Secretary)
 Moinul Islam (Secretary)
 Sayeeduzzaman (Secretary)
 Anisuzzaman (Secretary)
 Dr. A. Sattar (Secretary)
 M.A Samad (Secretary)
 Abu Tahir (Secretary)
 Al Hossaini (Secretary)
 Dr Tajul Hossain (Secretary)
 Motiur Rahman. Chairman of Trading Corporation of Bangladesh
 Maj. Gen K.M. Safiullah
 Air Vice Marshal Abdul Karim Khandker
 Commodore M.H. Khan
 Maj Gen. Khalilur Rahman
 A.K. Naziruddin Ahmed
 Dr. Abdul Matin Chowdhury
 Dr. Mazharul Islam
 Dr. Sramul Haq
 Badal Ghosh
 ATM Syed Hossain
 Nurul Islam
 Dr. Nilima Ibrahim
 Dr. Nurul Islam PG Hospital
 Obaidul Huq Editor Observer
 Anwar Hossain Manju Editor Ittefaq
 Mizanur Rahman Editor Bangladesh Press International 
 Manawarul Islam
 Abu Thaer Bhuiyan
 Brig. A. N. M. Nuruzzaman DG Jatiya Rakkhi Bahini
 Kamruzzaman teachers Association
 Dr. Mazhar Ali Kadri

Activities 

Many restrictive regulations coming from BaKSAL included the promulgation of the Newspaper Ordinance (June 1975; Annulment of Declaration) under which the declarations of all but four state owned newspapers were annulled. The Fourth Amendment was a direct attack on press freedom which allowed only the Dainik Bangla, Bangladesh Observer, The Daily Ittefaq, and Bangladesh Times to continue their publication and banned the rest of the press and newspaper industries. It brought the whole news media completely under the absolute control of the government.

Dissolution 

The party contested in 1986 general election using "boat" symbol and later in 1991 general election using "bicycle" symbol. The party carried out independently until 1990s, when almost all of its party leaders deserted the organisation to merge with the Bangladesh Awami League.

Legacy 

Lawrence Lifschultz wrote in the Far Eastern Economic Review in 1974 that Bangladeshis thought that "the corruption and malpractices and plunder of national wealth" was "unprecedented".

References

 
1975 disestablishments in Bangladesh
1975 establishments in Bangladesh
Bangladesh Awami League
Defunct left-wing political party alliances
Defunct political party alliances in Bangladesh
Parties of one-party systems
Political parties disestablished in 1975
Political parties established in 1975
Popular fronts
Sheikh Mujibur Rahman
Socialist parties in Bangladesh